The Ronnie Prophet Show was a Canadian music variety television series which aired on CBC Television in 1974.

Premise
Ronnie Prophet, who hosted the 1973 Country Roads series, was featured in this mid-season replacement of The Tommy Hunter Show. Series regulars included The Dave Woods Brass, vocal trio The Peaches and actor Heath Lamberts. Bob Farrar was the series musical director.

Scheduling
This hour-long series was broadcast on Fridays at 9:00 p.m. (Eastern) from 21 June to 6 September 1974.

References

External links
 
 

CBC Television original programming
1974 Canadian television series debuts
1974 Canadian television series endings
1970s Canadian variety television series
1970s Canadian music television series